The 1945 season was Wisła Krakóws 37th year as a club.

Friendlies

Puchar Wydziału Spraw Sędziowskich KOZPN

A Klasa - Kraków - qualifying round

External links
1945 Wisła Kraków season at historiawisly.pl

Wisła Kraków seasons
Association football clubs 1945 season
Wisla